A list of films produced in Russia in 2004 (see 2004 in film).

2004

See also
 2004 in Russia

External links
 Russian films of 2004 at the Internet Movie Database

2004
Films
Russia